The 2005 Mong shooting occurred on 7 October 2005 in Mong in the Mandi Bahauddin District, Punjab, Pakistan. Eight members of the minority Ahmadiyya Muslim Community were killed inside a mosque as worshipers were performing Salat.

Background
The Ahmadiyya movement was started in 1889 and follows the teachings of Mirza Ghulam Ahmad who they believe was sent by God as a prophet and the Promised Messiah and Imam Mehdi prophesied in Islam "to end religious wars, condemn bloodshed and re-institute morality, justice and peace." It is estimated there are between 3 – 4 million Ahmadis in Pakistan.

The Ahmadiyya Muslims have previously been targeted by Sunni groups, while they have also suffered discrimination in Pakistan in the past, most significantly during the Lahore riots of 1953. They were declared non-Muslim in Pakistan in 1973 by Zulfikar Ali Bhutto and were legally banned from identifying themselves as such in 1984 during General Zia-ul-Haq's Islamization as per Ordinance XX, despite Ahmadis calling themselves Muslim and following the rituals of Islam.

In August 2005, authorities closed down the offices of 16 publications run by followers of the sect in a Punjab city for "propagation of offensive material".

Attack
Three men riding on a motorcycle holding guns, came into the village of Mong in Mandi Bauddin on Friday morning. Two of the perpetrators went inside the mosque and started firing immediately, killing eight people. The attackers managed to escape after the attack.

Response
According to what a witness told Ahmadi author Qasim Rahid, police showed up several hours after the killing and "made no effort" to find the killers. 
Amnesty International stated that:

Interior Minister Aftab Sherpao stated:

Human Rights group stated that Ahmadis have constantly suffered persecution in Pakistan whereas Shahbaz Bhatti, head of the All Pakistan Minorities Alliance, said that the government had failed to protect minorities.

References

2005 murders in Pakistan
21st-century mass murder in Pakistan
Attacks in Pakistan in 2005
Mass murder in 2005
Ahmadiyya in Pakistan
Persecution of Ahmadis in Pakistan
Spree shootings in Pakistan
Massacres in religious buildings and structures
Massacres in Pakistan
Mandi Bahauddin District
Terrorist incidents in Pakistan in 2005
Crime in Punjab, Pakistan
October 2005 events in Asia
Attacks on religious buildings and structures in Pakistan